FC Maccabi Moscow (Russian: футбольный клуб Маккаби Москва) was a Russian amateur association football club, based in Moscow. The club was founded by the Russian Jewish businessman Pavel Feldblum in 2003, from the Jewish Community of Moscow. It became bankrupt in 2010, and dissolved that same year.

Honors and Trophy
Inter-nations League of Moscow: 2004
European Trophy of Maccabi: Second place 2006

External links
 Official Site of the FC Macccabi Moscow

Jews and Judaism in Moscow
Maccabi football clubs outside Israel
Jewish football clubs
Defunct football clubs in Moscow
2003 establishments in Russia
2010 disestablishments in Russia